Pissin' Razorbladez is Angerfist's first complete album. The boxset includes two CDs and a DVD with video material.

Track listing

Disc 1

Disc 2

DVD

External links
 Pissin' Razorbladez at Discogs

2006 debut albums
Angerfist albums